Leipzig Wilhelm-Leuschner-Platz is an underground railway station in the city of Leipzig, Germany. It was built as part of the Leipzig City Tunnel project and opened on 15 December 2013, enabling passengers to travel directly by rail from Leipzig Hauptbahnhof to the city centre.

Train services
Leipzig Wilhelm-Leuschner-Platz station is served by seven of the ten S-Bahn Mitteldeutschland lines. Planners hope that the high frequency service and fast journey times will increase passenger capacity on the city's public transport and thus relieve road traffic in the city.

The following services currently call at the station:

Tram services
2
8
9
10
11
14

Design
Located 20 m underground, Leipzig Wilhelm-Leuschner-Platz station has a 140 m long island platform. There are two entrances, north and south of the Martin Luther Ring-Road.

References

External links

 City Tunnel website

Wilhelm
Leipzig WilhelmLeuschner